Apororhynchus is a genus of small parasitic spiny-headed (or thorny-headed) worms. It is the only genus in the family Apororhynchidae, which in turn is the only member of the order Apororhynchida. A lack of features commonly found in the phylum Acanthocephala (primarily musculature) suggests an evolutionary branching from the other three orders of class Archiacanthocephala; however no genetic analysis has been completed to determine the evolutionary relationship between species. The distinguishing features of this order among archiacanthocephalans is a highly enlarged proboscis which contain small hooks. The musculature around the proboscis (the proboscis receptacle and receptacle protrusor) is also structured differently in this order. This genus contains six species that are distributed globally, being collected sporadically in Hawaii, Europe, North America, South America, and Asia. These worms exclusively parasitize birds by attaching themselves around the cloaca using their hook-covered proboscis. The bird hosts are of different orders, including owls, waders, and passerines. Infestation by an Apororhynchus species may cause enteritis and anemia.

Taxonomy
The first species in this order to be described was Apororhynchus hemignathi which was originally named Arhynchus hemignathi by Arthur Shipley in 1896. The name Arhynchus was chosen based on the characteristic absence of a proboscis in this species of Acanthocephala. It was later renamed Apororhynchus (along with the family name Apororhynchidae) by Shipley in 1899 due to the name Arhynchus having been used by Dujean in 1834 for a beetle.

Although Apororhynchus has not been included in phylogenetic analyses thus far due to insufficiency of morphological data, the lack of features such as an absence of a muscle plate, a midventral longitudinal muscle, lateral receptacle flexors, and an apical sensory organ when compared to the other three orders of class Archiacanthocephala indicate it is an early offshoot (basal).

Description
The genus Apororhynchus consists of ectoparasitic worms that attach themselves beneath the skin and around the anus of birds. The distinguishing features of this order among acanthocephalans are a highly enlarged proboscis with limited motility and a reduced size of the hooks (or spines). Apororhynchus species have short conical trunks and a reduced or absent neck. The proboscis is large and globular with numerous deeply set spirally arranged rootless hooks usually not reaching the surface, or with no hooks. They contain sets of muscles that are common to all Acanthocephala including a proboscis receptacle, a receptacle-surrounding muscle called a receptacle protrusor, retinacula (connective tissue that stabilizes tendons), a neck retractor, proboscis and receptacle retractors, circular and longitudinal musculature under the metasomal (trunk) tegument, and a single muscular layer beneath the proboscis wall.

Two regions of musculature are considerably different in Apororhynchus compared to the other acanthocephalan orders: the proboscis receptacle and receptacle protrusor are both reorganized in Apororhynchus with the muscles subdivided into strands extending from the cerebral ganglion, or nerve bundle, to the proboscis wall. These two muscles suspend the cerebral ganglion but are not involved in the eversion of the proboscis. Additional anatomical features that can be used to distinguish this genus among other acanthocephalans include a cerebral ganglion located under the anterior wall of the proboscis, long and tubular lemnisci (bundles of sensory nerve fibers) that run along a central canal, the lack of any protonephridia (an organ which functions as a kidney), and the presence of eight pear-shaped cement glands used to temporarily close the posterior end of the female after copulation.

Species

There are six species in the genus Apororhynchus. A seventh species, Apororhynchus bivoluerus Das, 1950 (also called A. bivolucrus) from an Egyptian vulture (Neophron percnopterus) from India was considered to be a strigeid trematode by Yamaguti (1963).
 Apororhynchus aculeatus Meyer, 1931

A. aculeatus has been found in Santos, Brazil, parasitizing a New World oriole. The parasite was discovered in 1931, in the Berlin Museum, taken from the digestive tube of a bird named at that time as "Oriolus cristatus", which was likely a crested oropendola (Psarocolius decumanus). A. aculeatus was the second parasite to be discovered in its genus, and the specimen used to describe the species was female. Numerous fine hooks on the bulb-shaped proboscis, as well as the different host and location, distinguish it from A. hemignathi.
 Apororhynchus amphistomi Byrd and Denton, 1949

The parasite was discovered in the summer of 1947 infesting a Canada warbler (Cardellina canadensis formerly Wilsonia canadensis) in Mountain Lake, Virginia, and a Northern parula (Setophaga americana formerly Compsothlyphis americana) in Augusta, Georgia, thus making it the third species in its genus to be discovered, and the first species in its genus to be discovered in North America. It was found in the digestive tract, just inside the vent. The species name amphistomi derives from a superficial resemblance to the amphistomate trematodes (flukes with stoma on opposite sides). On the proboscis, there are approximately 20 very fine hooks found on each of 40 rows. The two lemnisci are longer than the body length and are folded in the body cavity. Females are 2.13 mm long by 0.83 mm in maximum width and the proboscis is 0.36 mm long by 0.44 mm in maximum width. The male is smaller being 1.43 mm long by 0.53 mm in maximum width and the proboscis is 0.44 mm long by 0.74 mm in maximum width.
 Apororhynchus chauhani Sen, 1975

A. chauhani is the only Apororhynchus species described from India. It was discovered in Srishailam, Andhra Pradesh, in 1975. A. chauhani was named after Birendra Singh Chauhan, a member of the Zoological Society of India. It parasitizes the spotted owlet (Athene brama) and has been found in the intestine. The body is 4.70 mm by 1.70 mm long with a proboscis that is 1.11 mm by 1.68 mm in length and immature eggs are around 0.015 mm to 0.035 mm in diameter. The hooks on the proboscis are finger shaped and numerous, especially in the posterior. The rest of the hooks on the anterior side are irregularly directed and sparse. The proboscis sheath is absent. The nerve ganglion is large and located near the anterior proboscis. The lemnisci are very long and unequal.
 Apororhynchus hemignathi (Shipley, 1896)

A. hemignathi was the first species of Apororhynchus to be described with the creation of the genus and family by Arthur Shipley in 1896 due to its uniqueness among already described Acanthocephala. It has been found in Kaua'i, Hawaii, parasitizing the now extinct Kauaʻi ʻakialoa (Akialoa stejnegeri). A. hemignathi was named after the genus of the Kauaʻi ʻakialoa, which was Hemignathus at the time of the description. Specimens range from 2.5 mm to 3.5 mm long, distended 1 mm to 1.5 mm longer. It has two to four nuclei in the lemnisci. It is the type species for the genus.
 Apororhynchus paulonucleatus Khokhlova and Cimbaluk, 1966

This parasite has been found in the black-winged pratincole (Glareola nordmanni) at Malye Chany Lake, in Russia, and in the colon and cloaca of the Eastern yellow wagtail (Motacilla tschutschensis) in Chukotka and Kamchatka (including the Karaginsky Island), also in Russia. It was described in 1966. The proboscis is large compared to the body and spherical. It is armed with 10–12 spiral rows of hooks with 14–15 hooks in each row. The hook has a thin blade with a curved tip and root thickened with broadened base. In the body, there are 10–16 giant nuclei with a diameter of 0.050–0.077 mm. There is a very short neck (0.153 mm long) between the proboscis and the body with attached ribbon-like lemnisci longer than their own body length. Females are 3.7 mm long by 0.92 mm in maximum width and the proboscis is  1.30 mm long by 1.53 mm in maximum width. The male is smaller being 3.21 mm long by 0.766 mm in maximum width and the proboscis is 0.796 mm long by 0.995 mm in maximum width. The eggs were oval shaped with three concentric shells around 0.074–0.080 mm long and 0.040–0.043 mm wide.

 Apororhynchus silesiacus Okulewicz and Maruszewski, 1980

A. silesiacus was found in the cloaca of the European robin (Erithacus rubecula), the thrush nightingale (Luscinia luscinia) and the common nightingale (Luscinia megarhynchos) in Wroclaw, Poland, and of the European robin in Alsóperepuszta, Hungary. Described in 1980, it is the most recently classified species of the Apororhynchus. A. silesiacus is named after Silesia, a region in Poland where the parasite was found. Specimens were between 3.21 and 3.51 mm in total length, with a maximum width of 0.80 to 1.05 mm at middle and the eggs were around 0.07 mm long and 0.035 mm wide. It has a proboscis wider than the anterior part of the trunk, with about 40 spiral rows of hooks, each row bearing 14 to 16 hooks. There are 28 to 31 giant nuclei in the body wall and 9 to 12 in the lemnisci. The testes are almost parallel. The parasite has been found infesting juvenile European robins, indicating that the infestation occurred in the nesting area.

Hosts
Apororhynchus species exclusively parasitize avian hosts of different orders including owls, waders, and passerines. The parasite attaches to the cloaca and in some cases the intestinal wall using a hook-covered proboscis. Infestation can cause enteritis and anemia in Hawaiian honeycreepers.

Notes

References

External links
 

Archiacanthocephala